Kings County is a county located in the U.S. state of California. The population was 152,486 at the 2020 census. The California Department of Finance estimated the county's population was 152,940 as of July 1, 2019.  The county seat is Hanford.

Kings County comprises the Hanford-Lemoore, CA metropolitan statistical area, which is also included in the Visalia-Porterville-Hanford, CA combined statistical area. It is in the San Joaquin Valley, a rich agricultural region.

History
The area was inhabited for thousands of years by native Americans including the Tachi Yokuts tribe. They continue to live in the area on the Santa Rosa Rancheria. It was colonized by Spain, Mexico and the United States.

An 1805 expedition probably led by Spanish Army Lieutenant Gabriel Moraga recorded discovering the river, which they named El Rio de los Santos Reyes (River of the Holy Kings) after the Three Wise Men of the Bible.  At the time of the United States conquest of California in 1848, the new government changed the name to Kings River after which the county was named.

This event became known as the Mussel Slough Tragedy.

Kings County was formed in 1893 from the western part of Tulare County.  In 1909, by an act of the state legislature,  of Fresno County territory was added to the northwest portion of Kings County.

Settlers reclaimed Tulare Lake and its wetlands for agricultural development.  In surface area, it was formerly the largest body of freshwater west of the Great Lakes, and supported a large population of migratory birds as well as local birds and wildlife. Monoculture has sharply reduced habitat for many species.

In 1928, oil was discovered in the Kettleman Hills located in the southwestern part of Kings County. The Kettleman North Dome Oil Field became one of the most productive oil fields in the United States.

During the Great Depression, over 18,000 cotton pickers in the southern San Joaquin Valley, mostly migrant Mexican workers, went on strike in the California agricultural strikes of 1933. During the strike, 3,500 striking farm workers lived in a four-acre camp on the land of a small farmer on the outskirts of Corcoran. Ultimately, the federal government intervened to force both sides to negotiate a settlement.

Lemoore Army Airfield was established for training and defense during World War II.

The completion of the California Aqueduct in the early 1970s brought needed water for agriculture and domestic use to the west side of the county.

Historic sites
 Kingston
 Mussel Slough Tragedy
 El Adobe de los Robles Rancho built by Daniel Rhoads
 Vaca Adobe
 Cox & Clark Trading Post and Steamboat Landing
 Witt Site

Geography

Kings County is bordered on the north and northwest by Fresno County, on the east by Tulare County, on the south by Kern County and a small part of San Luis Obispo County and on the west by Monterey County.

Table Mountain is the highest point in Kings County at an elevation of 3,476 feet (1,059 m).  It is located in the Diablo Range in southwestern Kings County on the boundary between Kings and Monterey counties.

Most of the historic Tulare Lake was within Kings County.  Although reclaimed for farming late in the 19th century, it was the largest freshwater lake west of the Great Lakes.

Demographics

2020 census

Note: the US Census treats Hispanic/Latino as an ethnic category. This table excludes Latinos from the racial categories and assigns them to a separate category. Hispanics/Latinos can be of any race.

2011

Places by population, race, and income

2010 Census

The 2010 United States Census reported that Kings County had a population of 152,982. The census included inmates of the three men's state prisons.  According to the California Department of Corrections and Rehabilitation, there were 18,640 inmates in Kings County prisons on March 31, 2010, which was 12.2% of the population. The inmate population had been reduced to 13,894 on December 31, 2013. The racial makeup of Kings County was 83,027 (54.3%) White, 11,014 (7.2%) African American, 2,562 (1.7%) Native American, 5,620 (3.7%) Asian, 271 (0.2%) Pacific Islander, 42,996 (28.1%) from other races, and 7,492 (4.9%) from two or more races. Hispanic or Latino of any race were 77,866 persons (50.9%).

The U.S. Census does not identify how many residents are undocumented immigrants.  However, the Public Policy Institute of California issued a report in July 2011, which estimated there were 9,000 illegal immigrants living in Kings County in 2008, which would be 5.8% of the county's population.

According to the California Board of State and Community Corrections, Kings County had the highest incarceration rate of California's 58 counties in 2014 at 1,384 per 100,000 population.  Statewide, the rate was 567 per 100,000.

2000
As of the 2000 census, there were 129,461 people, 34,418 households, and 26,983 families residing in the county.  However, the California Department of Finance estimates that the population had grown 154,434 as of January 1, 2008.  The population density based on the 2000 census was 36/km2 (93/sq mi).  There were 36,563 housing units at an average density of 26 per square mile (10/km2).  The racial makeup of the county was 53.7% White, 8.3% Black or African American, 1.7% Native American, 3.1% Asian, 0.2% Pacific Islander, 28.3% from other races, and 4.8% from two or more races.  43.6% of the population were Hispanic or Latino of any race. 7.1% were of Portuguese, 6.2% German, 5.3% Irish and 5.1% American ancestry according to Census 2000. 63.6% spoke English, 30.9% Spanish, 1.4% Tagalog, 1.4% Portuguese and 1.3% Samoan as their first language.

There were 34,418 households, out of which 46.4% had children under the age of 18 living with them, 58.0% were married couples living together, 14.3% had a female householder with no husband present, and 21.6% were non-families. 17.0% of all households were made up of individuals, and 6.8% had someone living alone who was 65 years of age or older.  The average household size was 3.18 and the average family size was 3.56.

In the county, the population was spread out, with 29.0% under the age of 18, 11.8% from 18 to 24, 35.0% from 25 to 44, 16.8% from 45 to 64, and 7.4% who were 65 years of age or older.  The median age was 30 years in 2000, which had increased to 31.1 by the time of the 2010 census.  For every 100 females there were 134.8 males.  For every 100 females age 18 and over, there were 148.8 males.  The ratio may be attributed to the presence of three men's state prisons in the county.

Government and policing

Administration
Kings County is a general law county under the California Constitution.  That is, it does not have a county charter.  The county is governed by a five-member Board of Supervisors.  Supervisors are elected by districts for four-year terms.  There are no term limits in effect.  The Chairman and Vice-Chairman are elected annually by the Board of Supervisors from among its members.  On January 7, 2020, the Board elected Supervisor Doug Verboon as Chairman and Supervisor Craig Pederson as Vice-Chairman to serve during 2020.  Other Supervisors include Richard Valle, Joe Neves and Richard Fagundes. The Board of Supervisors appoints a County Administrative Officer.  Rebecca Campbell was appointed to that office effective on January 1, 2018.  She succeeded Larry Spikes who held the post from 1993 through 2017.

District Attorney
The Kings County District Attorney is Keith Fagundes.  The District Attorney of each of the 58 counties in California is responsible for prosecuting the violation of California state and local laws and ordinances.  The District Attorney is the sole criminal prosecuting entity in the county.  In addition to the prosecution duties of the District Attorney, the Kings County District Attorney also has civil and criminal investigative authority with its own Bureau of Investigations composed of sworn peace officers with arresting authority.  The Kings County District Attorney's Victim-Witness Assistance Program also provides assistance to victims of crime through federal, state, and local resources.

City police departments
Within Kings County, there are four city police departments: Hanford (the county seat), Corcoran, Lemoore, and Avenal.

Sheriff
The Kings County Sheriff-Coroner-Public Administrator is David Robinson.  The Kings County Sheriff's Office provides court protection, county jail operation, and coroner services for the entire county. It provides patrol and detective services to the unincorporated areas of the county.

State and federal representation

In the United States House of Representatives, Kings County in California's 21st District and is represented by Republican David Valadao.

Politics

Voter registration
According to the Kings County Election Office, as of March 24, 2017, 51,323 residents were registered to vote. There were 22,341 voters registered as Republicans, 17,429 registered as Democrats and 9,443 did not state a party preference. The remaining 2,104 registered with minor parties.

Cities by population and voter registration

Overview 
Kings has long been a strongly Republican county in Presidential elections. The last Democratic candidate for President to win the county was Hubert Humphrey in 1968, and the last to win a majority was Lyndon Johnson in 1964.

In November 2008, Kings County voted 73.7% for Proposition 8 which amended the California Constitution to define marriage as one man and one woman.

Crime 

The following table includes the number of incidents reported and the rate per 1,000 persons for each type of offense.

Cities by population and crime rates

Economy
The economy is based on agriculture.  About 87% of Kings County's 890,000 acres is agricultural farmland.  The gross value of all agricultural crops and products produced during 2018 in Kings County was $2,351,983,000.  Kings County is 10th among California counties in agricultural production.  The top commodity in 2018 was milk with a value of $676.7 million.  Other major agricultural commodities included pistachios, cotton, cattle and calves, almonds and processing tomatoes. Another major employer is NAS Lemoore, the U.S. Navy's newest and largest master jet base.  According to a Navy study in 2008, payroll, base spending, retiree and veterans' checks total more than $1 billion in annual economic impact to the region.  Other important employers include a Del Monte Foods tomato processing plant, Adventist Health, the J. G. Boswell Company, an Olam International tomato processing facility, Leprino Foods, the largest mozzarella cheese maker in the world, the Kings County Government and the California Department of Corrections and Rehabilitation which operates three state prisons in Kings County.

In 2011–2013, the U.S. Census Bureau estimated that the median household income in the county was $47,035 and that 17.6% of the population was below the poverty line. In 2018, according to the U.S. Bureau of Economic Analysis, average per capita income was $35,306 in Kings County, which ranked it last of California's 58 counties. Per capita personal income is calculated by dividing the population by the total personal income of the area's residents. In Kings County's case, the U.S. Census Bureau's estimated population of 151,366 was used for that calculation. However, the population estimate includes incarcerated persons with little or no income.

The homeownership rate was 54.2% at the time of the 2010 census. According to Zillow Real Estate Research, an estimated 24% of homeowners in the county owned their homes free and clear in the third quarter of 2012.

Taxable sales in 2015 totaled about $1.7 billion.

Kings County did not escape the effects of the Great Recession. The unemployment rate in May 2012 was 14.9%, up from 10.1% in July 2008.  However, the rate had dropped to 9.8% in February 2020 at the eve of the COVID-19 pandemic.  The unemployment rate had risen to 16.8% in April of that year.  According to the California Employment Development Department, as of December 2012, civilian employment totaled 53,100 and an additional 8,900 people were unemployed.  Many residents of Kings County were employed in services (31,900 persons, including 14,800 government employees) and agriculture (5,500 employees) as well as in some manufacturing enterprises (4,300 employees) and construction (1,000 employees).  Jeffrey Michael, director of the Business Forecasting Center at the University of the Pacific, stated in an October 2010 newspaper interview that nearly half of Kings County's personal earnings come from government jobs, which pay more than agricultural employment.

Kings County's dairy industry dropped from $670 million in milk sold in 2008 to $411 million in 2009 - a 39% drop. By mid-2009, the price paid to milk producers had dropped to a point that was far below the cost of production according to a July 2009 quote from Bill Van Dam, CEO of the Alliance of Western Milk Producers. By December 2010, milk prices had increased to about $13 per hundredweight from a low of below $10 in 2009. However, the price of corn used for feed had increased because of its use by the ethanol industry.  Van Dam was quoted that month as saying that at current prices, dairy operators are at or close to the break-even point.  By the summer of 2012, it was reported that despite a milk price of about $15 per hundredweight, the rising cost of cattle feed had caused many dairy farmers to sell all or part of their herds and even file for bankruptcy.  In 2014, milk prices were topping $22 per hundredweight and the value of milk sold rose to $970 million in that year.  However, by March 2016 milk was reportedly selling closer to $13 per hundredweight.

Culture
Kings County has a large annual celebration held each May called Kings County Homecoming Week.  In 2015, the event was scaled back to one day and renamed Pioneer Days.  The event returned as Kings County Homecoming Week in 2016 but without the traditional parade.

Transportation

Major highways
 Interstate 5
 State Route 33
 State Route 41
 State Route 43
 State Route 137
 State Route 198
 State Route 269

Public transportation
Kings Area Regional Transit (KART) operates regularly scheduled fixed route bus service, vanpool service for commuters and Paratransit (demand response) services throughout Kings County as well as to Fresno.

Amtrak trains stop in Corcoran and Hanford.

Orange Belt Stages provides inter-city bus service to and from Hanford. Connections with Greyhound can be made in Visalia or Paso Robles.

Airports
Hanford Municipal Airport is a general aviation airport located just southeast of Hanford.  The privately owned airport in Avenal is the home of the Central California Soaring Club.

Communities

Incorporated cities
Avenal
Corcoran
Hanford (county seat)
Lemoore

Census-designated places
 Armona
 Grangeville
 Hardwick
 Home Garden
 Kettleman City
 Lemoore Station
 Stratford

Unincorporated communities

 Halls Corner
 Hub
 Hydril
Island District
Lakeside
 Pitco
 Shell

Formerly proposed new city 
Quay Valley

Native American Reservation 
Santa Rosa Rancheria

Population ranking

The population ranking of the following table is based on the 2010 census of Kings County.

† county seat

See also 

California census statistical areas
List of museums in the San Joaquin Valley
Mussel Slough Tragedy
National Register of Historic Places listings in Kings County, California

Explanatory motes

References

External links

 
 Kings County Crop Reports
 Kings County Community Health Status Report, 2008-2009
 Kings County history website operated by the Kings County Office of Education 
 Kings County Economic Development Corporation website
 Kings County Facts - Index Mundi

 
California counties
San Joaquin Valley
1893 establishments in California
Populated places established in 1893
Majority-minority counties in California